Events from the year 1880 in Canada.

Incumbents

Crown 
 Monarch – Victoria

Federal government 
 Governor General – John Campbell, Marquess of Lorne 
 Prime Minister – John A. Macdonald
 Chief Justice – William Johnstone Ritchie (New Brunswick)
 Parliament – 4th

Provincial governments

Lieutenant governors 
Lieutenant Governor of British Columbia – Albert Norton Richards  
Lieutenant Governor of Manitoba – Joseph-Édouard Cauchon  
Lieutenant Governor of New Brunswick – Edward Barron Chandler (until February 6) then Robert Duncan Wilmot (from February 11)
Lieutenant Governor of Nova Scotia – Adams George Archibald     
Lieutenant Governor of Ontario – Donald Alexander Macdonald (until July 1) then John Beverley Robinson   
Lieutenant Governor of Prince Edward Island – Thomas Heath Haviland 
Lieutenant Governor of Quebec – Théodore Robitaille

Premiers    
Premier of British Columbia – George Anthony Walkem  
Premier of Manitoba – John Norquay 
Premier of New Brunswick – John James Fraser   
Premier of Nova Scotia – Simon Hugh Holmes  
Premier of Ontario – Oliver Mowat    
Premier of Prince Edward Island – William Wilfred Sullivan 
Premier of Quebec – Joseph-Adolphe Chapleau

Territorial governments

Lieutenant governors 
 Lieutenant Governor of Keewatin – Joseph-Édouard Cauchon
 Lieutenant Governor of the North-West Territories – David Laird

Events
February 4 – Five members of the Donnelly family are killed near Lucan, Ontario
February 14 – The wife of the governor general, The Princess Louise, Marchioness of Lorne, is seriously injured when the viceregal sleigh overturns on a Rudolph Ottawa street.
March 25 – George Brown fatally shot by a disgruntled employee
May 4 – Edward Blake becomes the new leader of the Liberal Party of Canada
June 24 – "O Canada" first performed
July 16 – The Royal Canadian Academy of Arts is established
October 9 – The United Kingdom gives Canada control of the Arctic Archipelago.

Full date unknown
Emily Stowe becomes the first woman doctor to practise medicine in Canada
Sanford Fleming becomes chancellor of Queen's University 
Bell Canada founded
Canadian Pacific Railway (CPR). British-backed Canadian firm, headed by US railroad building genius (Sir William Cornelius Van Horne) gets the deal: $25 million, already completed sections free, all under-construction sections finished free, 20 year monopoly as only railway and 20-year control over rate-setting.
The Varsity, created.

Arts and literature
March 6 – The Royal Academy for the Arts is founded.

New books
Charles G.D. Roberts,  Orion and Other Poems

Births
January 17 – Mack Sennett, actor, producer, screenwriter and film director (d.1960)
January 18 – Richard Squires, politician and Prime Minister of Newfoundland (d.1940)
March 22 – Allison Dysart, politician, lawyer, judge and 21st Premier of New Brunswick (d.1962)
April 13 – Charles Christie, motion picture studio owner (d.1955)
August 6 – Leland Payson Bancroft, politician (d.1951)
August 12 – Jacob Penner, politician (d.1965)
August 14 – Percival Molson, athlete and soldier (d.1917)
August 29 – Marie-Louise Meilleur, supercentenarian, the oldest validated Canadian ever (d.1998)
October 12 – Healey Willan, organist and composer (d.1968)
October 27 – Vere Ponsonby, 9th Earl of Bessborough, businessman, politician and Governor General of Canada (d.1956)

Deaths
 January 19 – James Westcott, American-born United States Senator from Florida from 1845 till 1849 (born 1802)
February 6 – Edward Barron Chandler, politician (b.1800)
May 9 – George Brown, journalist, politician and one of the Fathers of the Confederation (b.1818)
June 12 – William Evan Price, businessman and politician (b.1827)
October 8 – Caleb Hopkins, farmer and politician (b.1785)  
October 18 – Luc-Hyacinthe Masson, physician, businessman and politician (b.1811)
December 8 – Charles Fisher, politician and 1st Premier of the Colony of New Brunswick (b.1808)
December 24 – David Christie, politician (b.1818)

Historical documents
Statute creates Canadian Pacific Railway as government-supported private company for benefit of B.C. and N.W.T.

Chief Ocean Man and another Nakoda (Stoney) describe attack on their people by Gros Ventre and Mandan from U.S. side of border

British order-in-council transfers Arctic islands to Dominion of Canada

Editorial on complaints of French-Canadians

Walt Whitman calls Thousand Islands most beautiful place on Earth

To avoid bankruptcy caused by westward expansion, Canada must declare independence

Painting: Trapper approaches animal caught in leghold trap

References
  

 
Years of the 19th century in Canada